Michael John Stead (born 28 February 1957 in West Ham) is an English former professional footballer who played for Tottenham Hotspur, Swansea City, Southend United, Doncaster Rovers, Fisher Athletic, Dagenham & Redbridge Chelmsford City and Heybridge Swifts.

Playing career
Stead joined Tottenham Hotspur as an apprentice in November 1974. He made his first class debut against Stoke City on 26 February 1976. The full back made 15 senior appearances for the Spurs  between 1976–77. In February 1977 Stead had a loan spell at Swansea City where he featured in five matches. Stead transferred to Southend United in September 1978 and went on to score four goals in 298 games between 1978–85. Doncaster Rovers manager Dave Cusack signed Stead in November 1985 and played in a further 85 matches as player/coach. After leaving Belle Vue in 1988, Stead joined non-league club Fisher Athletic. He later played for Chelmsford City, Dagenham & Redbridge and Heybridge Swifts.

Post–football career
After retiring from competitive football, Stead is a taxi driver based in Harlow, Essex.

References

External links
 Stead's Southend United stats
 Photo & profile at Doncaster Rovers
 

1957 births
Living people
Footballers from West Ham
English footballers
English Football League players
Tottenham Hotspur F.C. players
Swansea City A.F.C. players
Southend United F.C. players
Doncaster Rovers F.C. players
Fisher Athletic F.C. players
Chelmsford City F.C. players
Dagenham & Redbridge F.C. players
Heybridge Swifts F.C. players
Association football fullbacks
Association football coaches
Chelmsford City F.C. non-playing staff